Callirhoe involucrata is a species of flowering plant in the mallow family known by the common name purple poppy-mallow. It is native to the United States and northern Mexico.

References

involucrata
Flora of the North-Central United States
Flora of the South-Central United States
Flora of the Great Plains (North America)
Flora of Arkansas
Flora of Coahuila
Flora of Colorado
Flora of Nuevo León
Flora of Wyoming
Taxa named by Asa Gray
Flora without expected TNC conservation status